Guraleus tabatensis is a species of sea snail, a marine gastropod mollusk in the family Mangeliidae.

Description
The length of the shell attains 4 mm, its diameter 1.5 mm.

(Original description) This very rare shell contains six whorls, the upper three smooth, the rest about coarsely (about right) longitudinally costated  with no trace of transverse ribs. The shell is distinctly angulated at the shoulder. The aperture is long and measures a little shorter than half the height of the shell.

Distribution
This marine species occurs off Japan. It has also been found as a fossil in the Tabata region, near Tokyo.

References

External links
 
 Worldwide Mollusc Species Data Base:  Guraleus tabatensis

tabatensis
Gastropods described in 1906